The New Zealand national futsal team, nicknamed the Futsal Whites, is the representative side for New Zealand in international futsal and is governed by New Zealand Football (NZF). The nickname is a reference to the New Zealand national football team which is known as the All Whites, which in turn is based on the national team nicknames related to the All Blacks.

Tournament records

FIFA Futsal World Cup

FIFUSA/AMF Futsal World Cup

Oceanian Futsal Championship

Current squad
A 14-man Futsal Whites squad has been named to compete in the 2022 OFC Futsal Cup and will be coached by Marvin Eakins. All matches will be hosted at Vodafone Arena in Suva, Fiji. The competition will be held between 13–18 September 2022. New Zealand will play against Tonga, Vanuatu, and a FFA President's Five before commencing a knockout stage.

|}

Current technical staff

Former players

Results and fixtures

2022

References

Oceanian national futsal teams
Futsal
national